Peng Shaohui (6 September 1906 – 25 April 1978) was a general in the People's Liberation Army of China, who served two separate terms as deputy commander of the People's Liberation Army, from 1954 to 1967 and from 1969 to 1978. Peng was the  only fellow-villager of Mao Zedong in the People's Liberation Army. He was known as "One-Armed General".

Peng was a member of the 9th, 10th and 11th CCP Central Committee. He was a member of the 1st, 2nd and 3rd National Defense Commission. He was also a member of the 2nd, 3rd and 4th National People's Congress.

Biography

Early life
Peng was born into a family of farming background in Yanglin, Shaoshan, Hunan, on September 6, 1906, during the late Qing dynasty (1644–1911). When he was a child he began to pasture cattles for the local landlord. At the age of 16, he became a farm labourer.

Great Revolution (1924–1927)
In 1926, Peng joined the local farmers association. On January 10, 1927, he introduced their own situation to Mao Zedong, who investigated peasant movement at that time.

In May 1927, after the Mari Incident, Peng attended a military operation of attacking Changsha, which was organized by farmers association. After the failure of the revolution, he left home to take refuge in Mao Zedong. When he arrived in Wuhan, capital of Hubei, he had to join the National Revolutionary Army for a living.

Agrarian Revolution
In the spring of 1928, he was accepted to a military school, which was managed by Huang Gonglue and He Guozhong. In July he participated in the Pingjiang Uprising, which was led by Peng Dehuai, Teng Daiyuan and Huang Gonglue. He served as a squad leader in the 7th Regiment of the 5th Army of the Chinese Workers' and Peasants' Red Army. And in the autumn of that year, he joined the Chinese Communist Party.

From 1929 to 1933, he fought with the Kuomintang army in Pingjiang, Liuyang and Changsha. In March 1933, Peng led his troops attacking Mount Pili in the Fifth Encirclement Campaign against Jiangxi Soviet but suffered heavy casualties. His left arm was shot by two bullets, and the bone was broken. Due to serious injuries, three surgeries were unsuccessful, and finally had to cut off his left arm. In August of the year, Peng was decorated the Red Star Medal, 2nd Class. After leaving the hospital, he participated in the Mount Guangming attacks and his jaw was broken by bullets.

In October 1934, Peng joined the Long March, serving as a battalion commander in the 3rd Army Group.

In 1935, Peng was appointed chief of staff of the 30 Army, and soon was transferred to the China Red Army College as a teacher.

In June 1936, he became chief of staff of the 6th Army Group.

Second Sino-Japanese War
In 1937, the Second Sino-Japanese War broke out, Peng became a regimental commander in the 120th Division.

From April 1939 to 1941, he participated in the Hundred Regiments Offensive in Shanxi led by Peng Dehuai.

In 1942 he entered the Central Party School of the Chinese Communist Party. After graduation in 1943, he served as vice-president of Counter-Japanese Military and Political University and president of its 7th branch school.

Chinese Civil War
In 1945, Peng was deputy commander and then commander of Lüliang Military District. He led the Lüliang Battle and Fenxiao Battle.

In July 1948, he became commander of the 7th Column of Northwest Field Army and army commander of the 7th Army of the First Field Army, he took part in the Central Shanxi Battle and Taiyuan Battle.

In the summer of 1949, he liberated Tianshui and eventually wipe out all the Kuomintang troops.

People's Republic of China
After the establishment of the Communist State in 1950, Peng broke up a gang of bandits deep in the mountains in both provinces of Gansu and Sichuan.

In 1951 he founded the PLA First Infantry School and served as its first president.

In 1952 he was promoted to become deputy commander and chief of staff of the Northwest Military Region, a position he held until 1955.

He was deputy chief of staff of the People's Liberation Army and deputy director of its Training Department in October 1954, and held that offices until the end of August 1967. Then he was appointed vice-president of the PLA Academy of Military Science, assisting Ye Jianying to organize the academy.

In August 1969 he was appointed deputy commander of the People's Liberation Army again, and served until he died in April 1978. In 1969 he was elected a member of the Central Military Commission. On April 25, 1978, Peng died of illness in Beijing.

Personal life

Peng married Zhang Wei. They had four children, Peng Yanping, Peng Xiaoping, Peng Zhiqiang and Peng Wenqing.

Awards
 Red Star Medal, 2nd Class
 Order of Bayi, 1st Class
 Order of Independence and Freedom, 1st Class
 Order of Liberation, 1st Class

References

External links
 
 

1906 births
People from Xiangtan
1978 deaths
Chinese military personnel of World War II
People's Liberation Army generals from Hunan